Chromulinales is an order of Chrysophyceae, golden-brown algae or golden algae. It was first identified and defined by Adolf Pascher (1881–1945) in 1910.

Families
According to the GBIF;
 Chrysamoebaceae - (contains Chrysamoeba, Chrysidiastrum, Chrysostephanosphaera, Leukochrysis and Rhizochrysis)
 Chrysocapsaceae - (contains Chrysocapsa, Chrysocapsella, Chrysomorula, Dermatochrysis, Gloeochrysis, Naegeliella, Pascherella, Phaeaster and Tetrasporopsis)
 Chrysococcaceae - (contains Chrysococcocystis )
 Chrysolepidomonadaceae - (contains Chrysolepidomonas )
 Chrysosphaeraceae - (contains Chrysosphaera )
 Chrysothallaceae - (contains Phaeoplaca 
 Dinobryaceae - (contains Calycomonas, Chrysococcus, Chrysolykos, Conradocystis, Dinobryon, Dinobryopsis, Epipyxis, Kephyrion, Kephyriopsis, Lepochromulina, Ochromonas, Ollicola, Phaeosphaera, Poterioochromonas, Pseudokephyrion, 'Sphaerobryon, Stenokalyx, Stokesiella, Stylobryon Stylochrysalis and Stylopyxis)

Note; Previously included families Chromulinaceae and Paraphysomonadaceae have both been moved to Ochromonadales order.

Incertae sedis
Unplaced genera, includes; 
 Amphichrysis 
 Anthophysa 
 Chrysobotriella 
 Chrysoxys 
 Mucosphaera 
 Oikomonas 
 Pedospumella 
 Phaeobotrys 
 Synuropsis''

References

 

Chrysophyceae
Algae orders
Heterokont orders